Trust is an American drama television series created by Simon Beaufoy that premiered on March 25, 2018 on FX. The 10-episode season, written by Beaufoy and directed by Danny Boyle and others, is set in 1973 and recounts the abduction of John Paul Getty III, then-heir to Getty Oil, while he was in Italy.

The series received generally positive reviews from critics, who praised the performances (particularly those of Dickinson, Esper, Fraser, Sutherland and Swank) and the casting of native Italian actors to portray Italian characters.

Premise
Trust follows "the trials and triumphs of one of America's wealthiest and unhappiest families, the Gettys. Told over multiple installments... the series begins in 1973 with the kidnapping of John Paul Getty III, an heir to the Getty oil fortune, by the Italian Mafia in Rome."

Cast and characters

Main
Actors among the main cast are only credited for those episodes in which they appear.

Donald Sutherland as J. Paul Getty, an oil tycoon.
Hilary Swank as Gail Getty, the mother of John Paul Getty III.
Harris Dickinson as John Paul Getty III, the grandson of J. Paul Getty.
Michael Esper as John Paul Getty Jr., the son of J. Paul Getty
Luca Marinelli as Primo, an Italian gangster who leads the kidnapping of John Paul Getty III.
Hannah New as Victoria Holdsworth, the wife of John Paul Getty Jr.
Giuseppe Battiston as Bertolini
Sophie Winkleman as Margot
Verónica Echegui as Luciana
Francesco Colella as Leonardo, Don Salvatore's associate
Donatella Finocchiaro as Regina
Giovanni D'Aleo as Francesco, the son of Leonardo.
Nicola Rignanese as Don Salvatore, a crime lord and uncle of Primo.
Niccolò Senni as Stefano "Fifty" Nizzuto, the cousin of Primo.
Anna Chancellor as Penelope Kitson, a girlfriend of J. Paul Getty.
Amanda Drew as Belinda, a concubine of J. Paul Getty.
Andrea Arcangeli as Angelo, an English speaking minion of Don Salvatore that befriends John Paul Getty III.
Mauro Lamanna as Dante
Silas Carson as Jahangir "Bullimore" Khan, the butler of J. Paul Getty.
Jo Stone-Fewings as Dennis, the gardener of J. Paul Getty.
Laura Bellini as Gisela Martine Zacher, a German girl that John Paul Getty III falls in love with and eventually marries.
Sarah Bellini as Jutta Winklemann, the twin sister of Gisela.
Charlotte Riley as Robina Lund
Brendan Fraser as James Fletcher Chace, the chief of security for J. Paul Getty. He often breaks the fourth wall to tell the viewers about something.

Recurring

David Agranov as J. Ronald Getty, a son of J. Paul Getty
David Bamber as Bela Von Block
John Schwab as Lang Jeffries
Norbert Leo Butz as Gordon Getty, a son of J. Paul Getty
Kiersten Wareing as Cockney Pauline

Guest

Filippo Valle as George Getty, the son of J. Paul Getty who commits suicide.
Lynda Boyd as Jacqueline Getty
Bella Dayne as Talitha Getty, an ex-wife of John Paul Getty Jr.
Lucy Gentili as Ariadne Getty, sister of John Paul Getty III.
Rob Brydon as Richard Nixon, the 37th President of the United States.

Episodes

Production

Development
On March 9, 2016, it was announced that FX had given the production a series order for a first season consisting of ten episodes. The series had been developed at FX due to a "first look" deal between Danny Boyle and the network. Boyle is expected to executive produce the series alongside Simon Beaufoy and Christian Colson. Beaufoy is also expected to write the series and Boyle is expected to direct. Production companies involved with the series include FX Productions, Cloud Eight Films, Decibel Films, and Snicket Films Limited. On January 5, 2018, it was announced that the series would premiere on March 25, 2018.

Casting
In April 2017, it was announced that Donald Sutherland and Hilary Swank had joined the main cast in the roles of J. Paul Getty and Gail Getty, respectively. On May 15, 2017, it was reported that Harris Dickinson had been cast in the starring role of J. Paul Getty III. In June 2017, Brendan Fraser and Michael Esper joined the production as a series regulars in the roles of James Fletcher Chace and John Paul Getty II, respectively. Additionally, it was announced that Veronica Echegui had been cast in a recurring role. On July 14, 2017, it was announced that Hannah New had joined the series in a recurring capacity.

Filming
The series began shooting in 2017 in Rome, Italy.

Release

Marketing
On January 9, 2018, FX released the first official trailer for the series.

Controversy
On March 16, 2018, it was reported that Ariadne Getty, John Paul Getty III's sister, was considering legal action against FX and the producers of the series. Her attorney Martin Singer released a statement calling the series a "wildly sensationalized false portrayal" of the Getty family and that "It is ironic that you have titled your television series Trust. More fitting titles would be Lies or Mistrust, since the defamatory story it tells about the Gettys colluding in the kidnapping is false and misleading." In the statement, Singer went on to explain how his client objects to the alleged portrayal of the family as having played a role in the kidnapping themselves and that he considers it to be defamatory to falsely accuse someone of a crime.

Simon Beaufoy has stated that his decision to depict Getty as complicit in his own kidnapping was justified by his research into the matter, though none of the written biographies explicitly reach that conclusion. He stated that while reading Charles Fox's 2013 biography of Paul III, Uncommon Youth, "It became clear, reading in between the lines... that he actually kidnapped himself..." According to his theory, the plot then spiraled out of Paul's control when his grandfather refused to pay, causing several of his captors to sell their interest to a syndicate of more ruthless Mafiosi.

Renewal plans
On January 5, 2018, the series' producers appeared at the annual Television Critics Association's winter press tour during a panel discussion of the show. Simon Beaufoy spoke about the tentative plans for a potential second season, saying, "The idea is to go back to the 1930s to discover how John Paul Getty I became this extraordinary person with this huge hole in his soul." He went on to add that FX was pleased with how the first season had turned out and that he would be interested in returning for subsequent seasons.

Reception
The series received positive reviews from critics. On the review aggregation website Rotten Tomatoes, it holds a "Certified Fresh" 78% approval rating with an average rating of 6.5 out of 10, based on 60 reviews. The site's critical consensus reads, "Donald Sutherland delivers a powerful turn as the titular Getty in Trust, yet another telling of the affluent family's saga." Metacritic, which uses a weighted average, assigned the series a score of 67 out of 100 based on 24 critics, indicating "generally favorable reviews".

Matt Zoller Seitz, reviewing for the pop-culture website Vulture, called the show a "decadent true-crime with an acidic sense of humor" that "alternates satire, drama, kookiness, and shocking violence." USA Today complimented the quality of the casting, noting that "Sutherland is predictably solid, but Fraser is the surprise, in what's perhaps his big comeback vehicle." It was also described as "zippy and fast-paced," with a "heightened and stylish feeling." Brendan Fraser's performance as James Fletcher Chace has also received praise from critics; considering his long hiatus from film acting and retreat from celebrity, his role was welcomed as a successful comeback, with TV Guide humorously declaring it the start of a "Brenaissance".

See also
All the Money in the World, a 2017 crime film directed by Ridley Scott, starring Michelle Williams as Gail Harris, Christopher Plummer as J. Paul Getty, and Mark Wahlberg as Fletcher Chace.

References

External links

2010s American drama television series
Television series based on actual events
2018 American television series debuts
American biographical series
English-language television shows
FX Networks original programming
Getty family
Kidnapping in television
Television series set in 1973
Television shows set in Italy
Television shows set in Rome
Television series about families
Television series about organized crime